Stornoway RFC is a rugby union club based in Stornoway, Scotland. The club play their home matches at Bayhead Park.

History

The club was founded in 1952 by the Scotland international player Bob Bruce - who moved to the town - and a Stornoway engineer John Morrison.

Women's side

The club run also run a women's side.

Notable players

Men

Scotland international players

Honours

 Brin Cup
 Champions (2): 1990, 1997
 Highland District League
 Champions (5); 5 times between 1996 and 2001
 Highland District League Cup
 Champions (1): 2001

References

Scottish rugby union teams
Stornoway
Rugby union in Na h-Eileanan Siar
1952 establishments in Scotland
Rugby clubs established in 1952